Te Apiti may refer to:

Manawatu Gorge
Te Apiti Wind Farm

See also
Āpiti